Davao Oriental's at-large congressional district is an obsolete congressional district that encompassed the entire province of Davao Oriental in the Philippines. It was represented in the House of Representatives from 1968 to 1972 and in the Regular Batasang Pambansa from 1984 to 1986. The province of Davao Oriental was created as a result of the partition of Davao in 1967 and elected its first representative provincewide at-large during the 1967 Philippine House of Representatives special elections. Constancio P. Maglana served as this district's first representative. The district remained a single-member district until the dissolution of the lower house in 1972. It was later absorbed by the multi-member Region XI's at-large district for the national parliament in 1978. In 1984, provincial and city representations were restored and Davao Oriental elected one member for the regular parliament. The district was abolished following the 1987 reapportionment to establish two districts under a new constitution.

Representation history

See also
Legislative districts of Davao Oriental

References

Former congressional districts of the Philippines
Politics of Davao Oriental
1967 establishments in the Philippines
1972 disestablishments in the Philippines
1984 establishments in the Philippines
1986 disestablishments in the Philippines
At-large congressional districts of the Philippines
Congressional districts of the Davao Region
Constituencies established in 1967
Constituencies disestablished in 1972
Constituencies established in 1984
Constituencies disestablished in 1986